Heliocauta is a genus of flowering plants in the daisy family.

Species
There is only one known species, Heliocauta atlantica, native to Morocco.

References

Anthemideae
Monotypic Asteraceae genera
Flora of Morocco